Sabina Ddumba (born 23 February 1994) is a Swedish singer. Her music has soul, gospel, and R&B influences. Ddumba was a backing vocalist on Katy Perry's song "Walking on Air" in 2013 and has collaborated with artists such as the hip hop band Looptroop Rockers, duo Lorentz & Sakarias and Adam Kanyama in 2012. She is signed to Warner Music. Ddumba released her first single, "Scarred for Life", in 2014, and her second single, "Effortless" in 2015. Both were certified platinum. Ddumba appeared in Moraeus med mera in 2014 and performed at Grammisgalan in 2015. She performed at the 2015 Swedish Grammis, and in 2015 won 'Newcomer of the Year' at the Grammisgalan  and 2016 P3 Gold Awards.

Early life 
Sabina Ddumba was born on 23 February 1994 in Fisksätra, Nacka. She is the sixth child out of eight in her family. Her mother is Ugandan, and when she was eight years old, her mother moved back to Uganda. After listening to traditional Ugandan nursery rhymes and songs, she became interested in melody and phrasing. Ddumba has started writing songs since she was 10. In 2008, at the age of fourteen, she joined the Tensta Gospel Choir, and sang with the group for about six years. It was through this choir that she found singing was her vocation. Her father and relatives wanted her to pursue a more scholarly profession, such as a doctor.

Musical influences 
Ddumba was inspired by the Ugandan nursery rhymes and songs she heard when she was a child. She also grew up listening to the hip hop and R&B of the late 1990s. As her family was religious, the gospel music she heard in church on Sundays has also greatly influenced her musical style. Her time with the Tensta Gospel Choir strengthened the influence that gospel music has had on her work.

Career 
Ddumba participated in The X Factor Sverige in 2012. Also in 2012, she sang on Adam Kanyama's track, "The Golden Child" and collaborated with the duo Lorentz & Sakarias. In 2013 she sang background vocals for Katy Perry's single "Walking On Air", which was featured on Perry's album, Prism. The same year she collaborated with hip hop group Looptroop Rockers on their song "Sea of Death". In 2014 she released her first single, "Scarred for Life". After the release of this single, in 2015 she signed with Warner Music. In 2015, Ddumba released her second single, "Effortless", which was certified platinum in Sweden. The song was co-written with Carmen Reece, and produced by Nick Ruth and T-Collar. Her latest single, "Not Too Young" was 30 October 2015. This single was certified double platinum. In February 2015, Ddumba performed at the Swedish Grammys. In 2016, she performed "Not Too Young" at the P3 Gold Awards, winning the award for Newcomer of the Year. Ddumba will be releasing a follow up single to "Not Too Young" titled "Not Too Young Pt. II", which will be produced by Wolf Cousins.
In the autumn of 2016, she participated in TV4's "So Much Better", where she was among others praised for her interpretation of Uno Svenningson's song "Vågorna".

Discography

Albums

Singles

Promotional singles

Notes

References

External links 
Facebook

External links

Living people
1994 births
21st-century Swedish singers
English-language singers from Sweden
Singers from Stockholm
Swedish pop singers
Swedish soul singers
Warner Records artists
Swedish people of Ugandan descent
21st-century Swedish women singers